"Walk Away" is a song written by Joe Walsh and recorded by American hard rock band The James Gang, being featured as the first single from the group's studio album Thirds (1971). The song peaked at No. 51 on the Billboard Hot 100.

Composition
"Walk Away" is a combination of hard rock and funk, with some influence from soul music. Walsh's guitar work incorporates different types of distortion, including slide guitar. The lyrics are about the ending of a relationship.

Release and reception
The song peaked at No. 51 on the Billboard Hot 100 on July 24, 1971. The song was generally well-reviewed by critics. Allmusic's Matthew Greenwald called it "one of the most realized James Gang songs and recordings" and that Walsh's guitar "creates a universe of hard rock virtuosity."

Other versions
A live version of the song is on the James Gang Live in Concert album. The Eagles, a band that Joe Walsh joined after the James Gang, have performed the song at concerts.
Walsh's live cover reached #105 on Billboard in 1976.

Charts
James Gang

Joe Walsh

References

Songs written by Joe Walsh
1971 singles
1971 songs
Song recordings produced by Bill Szymczyk
ABC Records singles
James Gang songs